The Ministry of Religious Affairs (abbreviated as MoRA) is the ministry responsible for religious events, buildings, and Hajj in Bangladesh.

History
The ministry is responsible for the management of Hajj and Umrah in Bangladesh.Biswa Ijtema is also managed by the ministry. The ministry gained some attention after using Arabic script to discourage public urination; since few Bangladeshis understand Arabic, anything written in Arabic is presumed to be sacred and not to be urinated on.

Directorate
Waqf Administration
 Christian Religious Welfare Trust
 Bangladesh Hajj Office
 Buddhist Religious Welfare Trust
 Islamic Foundation Bangladesh is a government organization established in 1975 under the ministry working to disseminate values and ideals of Islam and carry out activities related to those values and ideals. The Head Office of the Foundation is in Dhaka, which is supported by 6 divisional offices and 64 district offices, as well as 7 Imam Training Academy Centers and 29 Islamic Mission Centers. The Director General is the Chief Executive of the Foundation.
 Hindu Religious Welfare Trust is a statutory body under the ministry which is responsible for the welfare of the Hindu community and the maintenance of Hindu temples.

See also 

 Minister of Religious Affairs (Bangladesh)

References

 
Religion in Bangladesh
Religious Affairs
Religious affairs ministries